This list contains the mobile country codes and mobile network codes for networks with country codes between 700 and 799, inclusively – a region that covers South and Central America. The Falkland Islands are included in this region, while the Caribbean is listed under Mobile Network Codes in ITU region 3xx (North America).

National operators

A

Argentina – AR

B

Belize – BZ

Bolivia – BO

Brazil – BR

C

Chile – CL

Colombia – CO

Costa Rica – CR

E

Ecuador – EC

El Salvador – SV

F

Falkland Islands (United Kingdom) – FK

French Guiana (France) – GF

G

Guatemala – GT

Guyana – GY

H

Honduras – HN

N

Nicaragua – NI

P

Panama – PA

Paraguay – PY

Peru – PE

S

Suriname – SR

U

Uruguay – UY

V

Venezuela – VE

See also
 List of mobile network operators of the Americas
 List of LTE networks in the Americas

References

Telecommunications lists
South America-related lists